Chan Yuen-han, SBS, JP (born 16 November 1946 in Baoan, Shenzhen, Guangdong, China) is a former member of Hong Kong Legislative Council and a noted Hong Kong female trade unionist. She is the vice-chairperson of the Hong Kong Federation of Trade Unions, and was one of the 52 founding members of the Democratic Alliance for the Betterment and Progress of Hong Kong.

In 1988, as FTU vice-chairwoman, she was the first FTU candidate to stand in local elections, winning a seat on Eastern District Council. She joined the Legislative Council of Hong Kong (Legco) in 1995 and was the first female trade unionist to serve as a Legco member.

References

External links
Legislative Councillor of Hong Kong Federation of Trade Union

1946 births
Living people
People from Bao'an County
Politicians from Shenzhen
Hong Kong Federation of Trade Unions
District councillors of Wong Tai Sin District
Hong Kong trade unionists
Members of the National Committee of the Chinese People's Political Consultative Conference
Alumni of the Hong Kong Polytechnic University
Alumni of the University of Warwick
Democratic Alliance for the Betterment and Progress of Hong Kong politicians
People's Republic of China politicians from Guangdong
District councillors of Eastern District
Members of the Provisional Legislative Council
HK LegCo Members 1995–1997
HK LegCo Members 1998–2000
HK LegCo Members 2000–2004
HK LegCo Members 2004–2008
HK LegCo Members 2012–2016
Hong Kong Affairs Advisors
Members of the Selection Committee of Hong Kong
Members of the Election Committee of Hong Kong, 2012–2017
Recipients of the Silver Bauhinia Star
20th-century Chinese politicians
21st-century Chinese politicians
20th-century Hong Kong people
21st-century Hong Kong people